Stephan Savoia is an American photographer who works for the Associated Press, where he has been a member of two Pulitzer Prize-winning teams. He is a graduate of the State University of New York at Potsdam. Events he has covered for the Associated Press include the millennium celebration in Times Square and the second Woodstock celebration in 1994. One of his Woodstock photos was the first digital photo that AP transmitted globally.

The 1993 Pulitzer Prize for Feature Photography recognized the AP "portfolio of images drawn from the 1992 presidential campaign". The same Prize in 1999 recognized its "striking collection of photographs of the key players and events stemming from President Clinton's affair with Monica Lewinsky and the ensuing impeachment hearings." Savoia snapped Clinton's personal secretary Betty Currie and her attorney Lawrence Wechsler outside a courthouse.

A photograph taken by Savoia at the 2009 Basketball Hall of Fame induction ceremony, depicting NBA player Michael Jordan crying after his speech, became widely shared on the Internet beginning in late 2014 as the Crying Jordan meme.

References

American photographers
Living people
Year of birth missing (living people)
State University of New York at Potsdam alumni
Pulitzer Prize for Feature Photography winners
Place of birth missing (living people)